CAAC Flight 2311 or China Northwest Airlines Flight 2311 was a scheduled passenger flight from Changsha Datuopu Airport, in Changsha, the capital of Hunan Province, China, to the former Guangzhou Baiyun International Airport. On 24 December 1982 it was flown by an Ilyushin Il-18B (registered in China as B-202). After landing at Baiyun Airport, a fire in the cabin produced toxic smoke whereupon the crew stopped the aircraft on the runway and evacuated the passengers. The fast-developing fire killed 25 passengers and seriously injured 22 passengers and 4 crew members. The fire, which was started by a passenger's cigarette, destroyed the aircraft.

Aircraft
The aircraft B-202 was an Ilyushin Il-18B four-engined turboprop built in the Soviet Union in 1959.

See also
 Inflight smoking
 Olympic Airways v. Husain – a US Supreme Court case arising from a passenger's death due to inflight smoking

Similar accidents
 Saudia Flight 163
 Air Canada Flight 797
 China Airlines Flight 120

References
Citations

Bibliography

Accidents and incidents involving the Ilyushin Il-18
CAAC accidents and incidents
Aviation accidents and incidents in China
Aviation accidents and incidents in 1982
Airliner accidents and incidents caused by in-flight fires
1982 disasters in China
December 1982 events in Asia